The Nkambe languages are a  group of Eastern Grassfields languages spoken by the Yamba and related peoples of the Western High Plateau of Cameroon.

The languages are Dzodinka, Kwaja, Limbum, Mbə’, Ndaktup, Mfumte, Yamba.

References

 
Languages of Cameroon
Eastern Grassfields languages